Roland Garcia is a professional pool player from Magalang, Philippines. Garcia reached the final of the 2017 WPA World Nine-ball Championship; but lost 5-13 to Carlo Biado. Garcia had also reached the quarter-final of the China Open in 2016, and the last 32 of the world nine-ball championship in 2018.

Titles
 2023 Cajun Coast Classic 9-Ball
 2021 Junior Norris Memorial Shoot Out 10-Ball
 2018 Manny Pacquiao 10-Ball Championship
 2018 Philippines vs. Chinese Taipei Challenge Match

References

External links
 Roland Garcia on AZ Billiards

Filipino pool players
Living people
1979 births